Robert Whitehead (1856 to 1938)  was an English land owner, businessman and Justice of the Peace (1915-1916). He was chairman or director of many business in the area including Cammell Laird shipbuilders, Brodsworth Colliery Staverly Coal and Iron Company and Leeds Forge Company Ltd and many more. He was the 2nd cousin to the Robert Whitehead who invented the torpedo and great-great Grandson of John Kay who invented the Flying Shuttle. 

In 1901 he took over the Hargate Estate, near the village of Wormhill, Derbyshire, where he lived until he died in 1938. He added massively to the estate which by 1910 comprised Hargate Wall, Hargate Hall, a lodge house, stables and huge centrally heated orangery. Hargate Wall and Hargate Hall actually swapped names. Robert Whitehead lived in the original Hargate Hall while Hargate Wall was being built. When it was completed he moved into it but renamed it Hargate Hall and his original house then became Hargate Wall.

A previous occupant of Hargate Hall was the notorious mill owner Ellis Needham who owned Litton Mill.

He was also a keen breeder of Shire Horses and in 1937 presented a cup to the Ashbourne Show - The Ashbourne Silver perpetual challenge cup which is awarded to the best mare or filly one year old and upward shown at the show.

References 

1. High peak News, 26 September 1938

2. Wormhill - the history of a High Peak village by Christopher Drewry

External links 
 Durham Mining Museum
 
 Rotherham Mining Heritage
 The Ashbourne Show results 2007

1856 births
1938 deaths
English businesspeople
English legal professionals
People from High Peak, Derbyshire